The 2021–22 Scottish League One (known as cinch League One for sponsorship reasons) was the ninth season of Scottish League One, the third tier of Scottish football. The season began on 31 July. 

Ten teams contested the league: Airdrieonians, Alloa Athletic, Clyde, Cove Rangers, Dumbarton, East Fife, Falkirk, Montrose, Peterhead and Queen's Park.

Teams
The following teams changed division after the 2020–21 season.

To League One
Promoted from League Two
Queen's Park

Relegated from the Championship
Alloa Athletic

From League One
Relegated to League Two
 Forfar Athletic

Promoted to the Championship
 Partick Thistle

Stadia and locations

Personnel and kits

Managerial changes

League summary

League table

Results

Matches 1–18
Teams play each other twice, once at home and once away.

Matches 19–36
Teams play each other twice, once at home and once away.

Season statistics

Scoring

Top scorers

Awards

League One play-offs
The semi-finals were contested by the teams placed second to fourth in Scottish League Two, as well as the team placed ninth in Scottish League One. The winners advanced to the final, with the highest-ranked team hosting the second leg.

Bracket

Semi-finals

First leg

Second leg

Final

First leg

Second leg

References

External links
Official website

Scottish League One seasons
3
3
Scot